Serpent Island may refer to:

 Serpent Island (film), a 1954 film directed by Tom Gries
 Snake Island (Black Sea), also known as Serpent Island
 , an island in Mauritius near Île Ronde, Mauritius

See also
 Snake Island (disambiguation)
 Ultima VII Part Two: Serpent Isle, 1993 video game